"She Got It Made" is the second single from Plies' fourth album, Goon Affiliated. The track has uncredited vocals by the American recording artist Maejor and was released onto the Internet on March 5, 2010. "She Got It Made" samples Rupert Holmes' hit song "Escape (The Piña Colada Song)".

Charts

References
   
   

   

2010 singles
Plies (rapper) songs
Maejor songs
Songs written by Maejor
Songs written by Plies (rapper)
Songs written by Clinton Sparks
2010 songs
Atlantic Records singles